The Delaware State Hornets are  the sixteen sports teams representing Delaware State University in Dover, Delaware in intercollegiate athletics, including men and women's basketball, cross country, tennis, and track and field; women's-only bowling, softball, and volleyball; and men's-only baseball. The Hornets complete in NCAA Division I; they have been members of the Mid-Eastern Athletic Conference since 1970. While most teams play in the MEAC, the women's soccer team competes as an independent, the women's equestrian team plays in the ECAC/National Collegiate Equestrian Association, the baseball and women's golf teams compete in the Northeast Conference, and the women's lacrosse team competes in the ASUN Conference.

The university's Department of Intramural Sports provides a wide variety of quality recreational programs for students, faculty and staff.

Teams
A member of the Mid-Eastern Athletic Conference (MEAC), Delaware State sponsors teams in six men's and twelve women's NCAA sanctioned sports.

Basketball
The university has both men's and women's basketball teams.

Its men's basketball team won the 2005 MEAC championship and earned a berth in the 2005 NCAA tournament. Playing as a sixteen-seed, the Hornets lost 57–46 in the opening round to one-seed Duke University. The Hornets also have made back to back National Invitation Tournament appearances in 2006 and 2007.

The women's basketball team won the 2006 MEAC championship and earned a berth in the 2006 NCAA tournament. Playing as a fifteen-seed, the Lady Hornets kept the game close down by only three until nine minutes remained in the game, but lost 62–47 in the opening round to two-seed Vanderbilt University.

References

External links